Penning may refer to:


Currency
Norwegian penning
Swedish penning

People
Mike Penning (born 1957), British politician 
Frans Michel Penning (1894–1953), Dutch physicist 
Edmund Penning-Rowsell (1913–2002), British journalist
Louwrens Penning (1854-1927), Dutch novelist

Other uses
Penning trap, energy storage device 
Penning gauge, vacuum gauge
Penning ionization, form of ionization 
Penning mixture, a gas mixture
Pony penning, annual pony roundup on Chincoteague island
Team penning, western equestrian sport
another word for writing
confining animals in an enclosure (pen)

See also
Pennings, a surname